The Order of Victory was the highest military decoration awarded for World War II service in the Soviet Union, and one of the rarest orders in the world. The order was awarded only to Generals and Marshals for successfully conducting combat operations involving one or more army groups and resulting in a "successful operation within the framework of one or several fronts resulting in a radical change of the situation in favor of the Red Army." The Order of Victory is a standalone decoration awarded specially for service in World War II; unlike other awards such as the Hero of the Soviet Union, it does not belong to any order of ranking. In the history of the Soviet Union, the award had been awarded twenty times to twelve Soviet leaders and five foreign leaders, with one revocation. The last living recipient was King Michael I of Romania, who died on 5 December 2017.

History
The order was proposed by Colonel N. S. Neyelov, who was serving at the Soviet Army Rear headquarters around June 1943.  The original name that Colonel Neyelov suggested was Order for Faithfulness to the Homeland; however, it was given its present name around October of that year.

On October 25, 1943, artist A. I. Kuznetsov, who was already the designer of many Soviet orders, presented his first sketch to Stalin. The sketch of a round medallion with portraits of Lenin and Stalin was not approved by the Supreme Commander. Instead, Stalin wanted a design with the Spasskaya Tower in the centre. Kuznetsov returned four days later with several new sketches, of which Stalin chose one entitled "Victory". He asked Kuznetsov to slightly alter the design, and on the 5th of November a prototype was finally approved. The order was officially adopted on November 8, 1943, and was first awarded to Georgy Zhukov, Aleksandr Vasilevsky, and Joseph Stalin. All three were awarded a second order a year or more later.

The order was also bestowed to top commanders of the Allied forces.  Every order was presented during or immediately after World War II, except for the controversial 1978 award to Leonid Brezhnev, who was not given a personal award, but an older one, originally awarded to Leonid Govorov, Marshal of the Soviet Union. (Govorov was already deceased, with his award returned to the state) Brezhnev's award was revoked posthumously in 1989 for not meeting the requirements for the award.

Like other orders awarded by Communist nations, the Order of Victory could be awarded more than once to the same individual. In total, the order was presented twenty times to seventeen people (including Brezhnev).

Unlike all other Soviet orders, the Order of Victory had no serial number on it, the number was only mentioned in the award certificate. After a holder of the Order of Victory died, the award was to be given back to the state. Most of awards are now preserved by the Diamond Fund in the Moscow Kremlin.  Notable exceptions are King Michael I of Romania's Order of Victory, which is held in the collection of the Romanian Royal Family, Dwight D. Eisenhower's Order of Victory, which is on display at the Dwight D. Eisenhower Presidential Library and Museum in Abilene, Kansas, Field Marshal Bernard Montgomery's Order of Victory, which is on display at the Imperial War Museum in London, and Josip Broz Tito's Order of Victory, which is kept in the Museum of Yugoslav History in Belgrade.

Construction details
The Order is made out of platinum in the form of a pentangular star with rays between the arms, measuring 72 mm in diameter.  The star is studded with 174 diamonds weighing a total of 16 carats (3.2 g), while the arms of the star are made out of ruby. The rubies in the arms are synthetic, not because the synthetic gems were cheaper, but because they had to be of a uniform color, which could not be guaranteed with natural stones.  In the center of the star is a silver medallion, 31mm in diameter, with the Moscow Kremlin wall, the Spasskaya Tower, and Lenin's Mausoleum depicted in gold surrounded by bands of laurel and oak also colored in gold. The star of the tower is studded with a natural ruby. The laurel and oak are bound with a red banner. The sky in the background is inlaid with blue enamel.

Against the sky, the letters "СССР" (USSR) appear in gold centered on the top of the medallion, while the word "Победа" (Victory) in white, is displayed on the red banner at the bottom, made with enamel. The total mass of the order is 78g, which consists of 47g of platinum, 2g of gold, 19g of silver, 25 carats of ruby and 16 carats of diamond. The medal is estimated to be worth $10 million.

Instead of being made at a mint, each Order was made in a jeweler's workshop.

Dwight D. Eisenhower had his star valued by an American jeweler; according to Bernhard, Prince Consort of the Netherlands (who, having been Commander of the Dutch Armed Forces during the war, was interested in receiving such a prestigious award himself but never got it), Eisenhower told him that his stones were "fakes".

Ribbon

The ribbons of various Soviet orders have been combined to create the Order Ribbon. The total length of the ribbon is 44 mm and it is mostly worn on the field uniform.  The following featured orders are depicted on the ribbon (read from outside towards the center):
Order of Glory (Орден Славы/Orden Slavy). Orange with black center stripe
Order of Bogdan Khmelnitsky (Орден Богдана Хмельницкого/Orden Bogdana Khmelnitskogo). Light blue stripe
Order of Alexander Nevsky (Орден Александра Невского/Orden Aleksandra Nevskogo). Dark red stripe
Order of Kutuzov (Орден Кутузова/Orden Kutuzova). Dark blue stripe
Order of Suvorov (Орден Суворова/Orden Suvorova). Green stripe
Order of Lenin (Орден Ленина/Orden Lenina).  Large Red stripe (center section)

List of recipients

Brezhnev's receipt of the Order of Victory was controversial.  Brezhnev was a young political officer during the war who did reach the rank of lieutenant general, but did not command responsibility close to the other recipients of the Order.  He only received the decoration after he was Premier and thus able to essentially award the medal to himself.  As a result of general hostility to Brezhnev after his death and belief that this award had been done out of vanity rather than earned from merit, the Order of Victory was posthumously revoked in 1989.

Fate of the Orders

After the death of the recipient of the Order of Victory, it was to be given back to the state.

All orders awarded to Soviet commanders are in Russia.
The Russian Central Museum of Armed Forces has five orders: two of A. Vasilevsky, two of G. Zhukov and one of R. Malinovsky.
The State Precious Metals and Gems Repository (Gokhran) in Russia has two orders: K. Rokossovskiy, and M. Rola-Żymierski.
All other orders that are in Russia are stored in the Moscow Kremlin, preserved by the Diamond Fund.
 King Michael I of Romania (d. 2017) was for 28 years the only living holder, following the death in 1989 of M. Rola-Żymierski; his order is held in the Royal Collection of the Romanian Royal Family.
 Tito's order is at the Museum of Yugoslav History, Belgrade (former the May 25th Museum)
Dwight D. Eisenhower's Order is on display at the Dwight D. Eisenhower Presidential Library and Museum in Abilene, Kansas.
Bernard Montgomery's Order is in the Imperial War Museum in London.

See also
Orders, decorations, and medals of the Soviet Union

References

External links

Decorated with the Supreme Military Victory Order
Order of Victory - 1943
 Orders and Medals of the USSR - Order of Victory
 Legal Library of the USSR

Military awards and decorations of the Soviet Union
Awards established in 1943
1943 establishments in the Soviet Union
Military awards and decorations of World War II